Hawthorne Public School may refer to:

Hawthorne Public School (Ottawa)
Hawthorne Public Schools, New Jersey